Dariusz Adamus (born 13 January 1957) is a Polish javelin thrower. He competed in the 1980 Summer Olympics.

References

1957 births
Living people
Athletes (track and field) at the 1980 Summer Olympics
Polish male javelin throwers
Olympic athletes of Poland
Sportspeople from Lower Silesian Voivodeship
People from Kłodzko
20th-century Polish people
21st-century Polish people